= A Maverick Heart =

2013 novel by Ravindra Shukla

A Maverick Heart Between Love and Life
- Author: Ravindra Shukla
- Language: English
- Published: 18 Feb 2013 Leadstart publishing
- Publication place: India
- Media type: Paperback
- ISBN: 978-93-82473-00-8
- Website: http://www.ravindrashukla.com/

A Maverick Heart Between Love And Life is a 2013 novel written by Ravindra Shukla, who is a graduate of the Indian Institutes of Technology (IIT) in Mumbai. It is based on Shukla's own experiences as a student, as well as events in the US corporate world and contemporary social changes in India.

== Plot ==
The story revolves around the personal and professional lives of three young people, Richita, Rahul, and Neerav, who became friends when they were students at the IIT. After college, Richita and Neerav both move to the United States, while Rahul is offered an important scholarship in mathematics. He turns it down in order to work for a volunteer organisation, and Richita and Neerav leave lucrative jobs, returning to India to help him.
